Dugald Carmichael (born 1772 in Stronacraoibh, Lismore Island, died 1827 in Appin) was a Scottish botanist and officer in the 72nd Highlanders. He is known as the "Father of Marine Botany".  The plant genus Carmichaelia is named after him.

He was a friend of Sir William Hooker.

See also
:Category:Taxa named by Dugald Carmichael

References

Scottish botanists
Scottish marine biologists
Marine botany
1772 births
1827 deaths
Scottish soldiers
72nd Highlanders officers
People from Argyll and Bute
18th-century British botanists
19th-century British botanists
18th-century Scottish people
19th-century Scottish people